The Mission may refer to:

Film and theater 
 The Mission (1983 film) directed and produced by Parviz Sayyad
 The Mission (1986 film) directed by Roland Joffé
 The Mission (1999 film), a.k.a. Cheung fo, directed and produced by Johnnie To
 The Mission (play), 1980 German play (Der Auftrag) by former East German playwright Heiner Müller

Music
 The Mission (soundtrack), the original score album of the 1986 film by Ennio Morricone
 The Mission (band), known as The Mission UK in the United States, British gothic rock band formed in 1986
 "The Mission", a song from the 1988 album Operation: Mindcrime by Queensryche
 The Mission (Captain Jack album), 1996
 The Mission (Royal Hunt album), 2001
 "The Mission", a song by 30 Seconds to Mars from their 2002 self-titled album
 "The Mission", a song on Puscifer's 2009 album "C" is for (Please Insert Sophomoric Genitalia Reference HERE)
 "The Mission" (theme music), composed by John Williams, used as the basis of themes of various NBC and Seven news programs
 The Mission (Styx album), 2017

Other uses
The Mission, novel by Hans Habe based on the events surrounding the Evian Conference in 1938
 The Mission, newsletter by University of Texas Health Science Center at San Antonio
 "The Mission", a 1985 episode from the TV series Amazing Stories directed by Steven Spielberg
 Mission District, San Francisco, California, US
 The Mission (Vacaville, California), a nondenominational Christian church

See also
 Mission (disambiguation)
 La Mission (disambiguation)